Mardaani 2 is a 2019 Indian Hindi-language action thriller film and a sequel to the 2014 film Mardaani. It is directed by Gopi Puthran who wrote the previous film, marking his directorial debut, and backed by Aditya Chopra through Yash Raj Films, with Rani Mukerji reprising her role of police officer Shivani Shivaji Roy from the previous film. The plot follows her attempts to catch a 21-year-old rapist and murderer, played by newcomer Vishal Jethwa.

Mardaani 2 was announced on 10 December 2018 by a social media post. Filming began in March 2019 and was extensively done in Rajasthan. The first look was unveiled in April 2019 and release date was announced in September 2019.

Plot
The opening credits show Shivani Shivaji Roy (Rani Mukerji) clearing the UPSC exams in 2015 to become an Indian Police Service officer.

In Kota, Rajasthan, a 21-year-old psychopath, Sunny (Vishal Jethwa), kidnaps an outspoken young woman, Latika. He brutally tortures and rapes her, then murders her. Shivani, who has been appointed as the new Superintendent of Police of Kota, arrives at the crime scene and clashes with her subordinate DSP Brij Shekhawat (Sumit Nijhawan) who is misogynistic. The brutality of the murder disturbs Shivani and makes her more determined to catch the killer.

Sunny, who has actually come to Kota from Meerut on a killing contract given by politician Govind Mishra a.k.a. Panditji (Prasanna Ketkar), sees Shivani on TV when she publicly promises to find Latika's killer. He taunts her by sneaking into her home and stealing her sari, he then dresses up as a woman, tricks the journalist, and kills him; he also hires Pravin, a tea-seller near the police station, to kill the journalist's wife, Aabha Parihar, in a suicide blast, then takes Pravin's place as tea-seller to keep an eye on her, introducing himself as a mute boy named Bajrang.

When Shivani brings in Lahanya, a child from the slums who had witnessed the blast, Sunny kills him. Following the media uproar on the failure of the police to catch the murderer, Shivani is set to be transferred from Kota. Since the new officer will come after two days, Shivani, along with her teammates, decides to catch Sunny within the two days. Shivani makes peace with Shekhawat since his network of informers is very strong in the city, and he leads them to his contact, who reveals that the real mastermind behind the killing of Kamal Parihar is the youth politician Viplav Beniwal (Sunny Hinduja). Shivani arrests Beniwal's right-hand man Kunwar and is brutally tortured into revealing the whereabouts of Sunny. Sunny kidnaps another outspoken woman but the police track him down. They discover her already raped and tortured but still alive and manage to save her.

Sunny, acting as Bajrang, gets a lift from Shivani. Before he can strangle her, Shivani stops him, having realized that Bajrang is Sunny. The two fight but Sunny escapes. The police find a video of Sunny taken by a bystander, and Shivani has it made viral on all social media platforms. Sunny kidnaps Pandit's granddaughter Priyanka and threatens to kill her unless Shivani apologizes to him. Shivani and the police manages to save the girl. Shekhawat mends his ways and agrees to help Shivani. Shivani discovers that Sunny's next target is the female politician Sunanda. That night, amidst the Diwali celebrations, Shivani and her team search for him. She discovers him in the house of a local couple, having taken their daughter and Sunanda hostage. Shivani is knocked unconscious and tied up.

When she awakes, Sunny is strangling Sunanda; to distract him, Shivani talks about his mother and his past, which she learned from Sunny's father, who is imprisoned in Meerut. As a child, Sunny's father had tried to murder Sunny's mother, who had been an outspoken woman. In terror, Sunny's mother had hidden on the terrace, but Sunny told his father where she was hiding; his father then killed her. The guilt of his mother's death has since caused Sunny to become unhinged and take that anger out on other confident girls.

Shivani signals Sunanda and the other hostage to toss the nearby buckets of paint on Sunny, as he is asthmatic. She then gains the upper hand, beating Sunny with his own belt. She kicks him outside and continues beating him as the neighbourhood gathers to watch.

Cast
 Rani Mukerji as SP Shivani Shivaji Roy IPS
Vishal Jethwa as Shiv 'Sunny' Prasad Yadav also Bajrang Chaiwala (another character of mute boy)
 Jisshu Sengupta as Dr. Vikram Bose Roy, Shivani's husband
 Shruti Bapna as Inspector Bharti Angare
 Vikram Singh Chauhan as Inspector Anup Singhal
 Rajesh Sharma as Amit Sharma
 Tejasvi Singh Ahlawat as Latika Agarwal, the girl who was raped in the first scene of the film
 Pratyksh Rajbhatt as Monty, Latika's friend
 Prasanna Ketkar as politician Govind Mishra a.k.a. Panditji, Sunny's boss
 Virti Vaghani as Priyanka, Panditji's granddaughter
 Anurag Sharma as Journalist Kamal Parihar, Abha's husband
 Sunny Hinduja as Viplav Beniwal
 Sumit Nijhawan as DSP Brij Shekhawat
 Richa Meena as Sunanda Chaudhary
 Deepika Amin as Dr. Harni Kapur, a doctor who operated on Latika
 Avneet Kaur as Meera, Shivani's niece
 Pariva Pranati as Abha Parihar, Kamal's wife
 Garima Jain as Reporter
 Aanchal Srivastava as Tina
 Suresh Anand as Rawat
 Vishal Nath as Pravin
 Vishal Sudarshanwar as SHO Vinay Jaiswal
 Girish Sharma as Kunwar
 Anchal Sahu as Brij's daughter

Production
On 10 December 2018 Yash Raj Films announced on their official Twitter account the making of sequel to their hit film Mardaani to be directed and scripted by Gopi Puthran. Rani Mukerji is to reprise her role of Shivani Shivaji Roy of the last film. Vikram Singh Chauhan and Shruti Bapna later on added to the cast.

Filming

The principal photography began on 27 March 2019. The official Twitter page of Yash Raj Films posted the announcement of beginning of the shooting and shared a picture from the sets of the film. Rani Mukerji went to the second schedule of filming in the first week of May in Kota and Jaipur in Rajasthan. Mukerji shooting in Rajasthan was battling in 42 °C temperature while filming fighting scenes. The Rajasthan schedule of the film was wrapped up on 29 May.

Release
The film was released on 13 December 2019.

Box office

Mardaani 2 was released worldwide on 2105 screens. The film's opening day nett domestic collection was 3.80 crore. In the next two days, it earned nett 6.55 crore and 7.80 crore respectively. It grossed ₹67.12 in worldwide areas, consisting of ₹56.63 crore (Indian gross) and ₹10.49 crore (overseas gross).

Awards and nominations

Sequel

In December 2019, it was announced that Rani Mukerji is set to reprise her role in the third installment of Mardaani franchise titled Mardaani 3.

References

External links 
  by Yash Raj Films

Mardaani 2 on Bollywood Hungama

2010s Hindi-language films
2010s feminist films
2019 films
2019 action thriller films
Fictional portrayals of police departments in India
Films about women in India
Films set in Rajasthan
Films shot in Jaipur
Films shot in Rajasthan
Indian action thriller films
Indian feminist films
Indian sequel films
Kota, Rajasthan
Rajasthan Police
Yash Raj Films films